The Bleeders are a punk hardcore influenced group from West Auckland, New Zealand. 
The group formed in 2002 consisting of members, Angelo Munro (vocals), Gareth Stack (Bass), Ian King (Guitar), Hadleigh Donald (Guitar) and Matt (George) Clark (Drums).In 2019 Aaron Goddard replaced Hadleigh Donald on guitar

Biography
2003 saw their debut release ‘'A Bleeding Heart EP'’ released on independent label ElevenfiftySeven Records.  Quickly Bleeders gained momentum with sold-out shows, strong sales, radio and music television support ultimately leading them to sign with Universal Music NZ.

In 2005, Bleeders flew to the US to record their debut full-length album with renowned producer Sal Villanueva who has produced the likes of  Thursday, Taking Back Sunday, and Skarhead to name a few. Villanueva worked with the band to create a more crossover sound that would help them reach a broader audience.

Titled ‘'As Sweet as Sin'’ the album was released in New Zealand and Australia in 2006 and debuted at number 2 on the New Zealand top 40 charts and went on to reach "Gold" status in sales, as well as picking up prestige Awards of "Best Rock Album " and "Breakthrough Artist" at the 2007 New Zealand music awards.

Bleeders spent the next few years building on their fan base with several tours of New Zealand and Australia, Supported acts such as AFI, Avenged Sevenfold and Motorhead along with shows in the UK with the Misfits to name a few.

2007 the band released the self-titled 2nd album, this time choosing to stay in NZ and record at the legendary York St studios with producer Clint Murphy.

The band chose to bring back the raw aggression that had been a winning formula in the past while still evolving a strong rock crossover.

This enabled the band to hold onto a loyal core of fans, and still to this day the 2nd album is stated by the band as their best and proudest work to date.

In 2009 the band spent the year based in Toronto, Canada so they could concentrate on the North American market, in their time there they supported the likes of Alexisonfire and Cancer Bats. While the band ticked many boxes in their time there, the grind got the better of them and they disbanded in Dec 2009.

Since their split in 2009 the band have reunited on a couple of occasions once in 2012 again in 2016 both times to sold-out shows at Auckland's legendary Kings Arms -RIP

In 2019 the band reformed and released the comeback EP “Darkness Falls”. This marked the bands return to their roots teaming up with 1157 records once again. The new EP was released on 12 inch vinyl with the “B side” a remastered version of the debut “A bleeding heart ep”.Throughout 2019/2020 Bleeders played a string of shows throughout NZ until the dreaded Covid 19 Pandemic.

Albums

Singles

Compilations

References

External links
Official Myspace page
Elevenfiftyseven Records

New Zealand punk rock groups